Green Charter Township is a charter township of Mecosta County in the U.S. state of Michigan.  As of the 2000 census, the township population was 3,209. The township was organized in 1858, before Mecosta County was detached from Newaygo County.

Communities 
John Parish is considered the "father" of the village, having arrived in the 1850s and then platted the village in 1865. It was at first named Parish after him, but the name later became Paris. A fire on May 26,1879, destroyed a large portion of the village, including records of Green Township. The Paris ZIP code, 49338, serves the northwest portion of Green Township. Paris Park, north of town, was the site of the second fish hatchery in the state of Michigan. The Paris Fish Hatchery opened in 1881, and from 1913 to 1938, salmon and brown trout fingerlings were shipped by rail baggage cars in milk cans painted a distinctive red. The Works Progress Administration renovated and expanded the facility in the mid-1930s. The hatchery operated until 1964, and in 1972 was acquired by the Mecosta County Park Commission and refurbished as a park that reopened in July 1976. In 1980, students from the Mecosta-Osceola Career Center in Big Rapids built a  replica of the Eiffel Tower out of metal frames from WPA workers' beds that had been stored in barns.

Geography
The city of Big Rapids is to the south, and the Big Rapids ZIP code 49307 also serves part of southern Green Township.
The city of Hersey is to the northeast in Osceola County, and the Hersey ZIP code 49639 also serves the northeast portion of Green Township.

Demographics
As of the census of 2000, there were 3,209 people, 1,247 households, and 864 families residing in the township. The racial makeup of the township was 97.20% White, 0.87% African American, 0.47% Native American, 0.03% Asian, 0.22% from other races, and 1.22% from two or more races. Hispanic or Latino of any race were 1.03% of the population.

There were 1,247 households, out of which 34.0% had children under the age of 18 living with them, 56.0% were married couples living together, 10.0% had a female householder with no husband present, and 30.7% were non-families. 23.9% of all households were made up of individuals, and 6.8% had someone living alone who was 65 years of age or older.  The average household size was 2.57 and the average family size was 3.05.

In the township the population was spread out, with 26.7% under the age of 18, 9.6% from 18 to 24, 28.8% from 25 to 44, 23.5% from 45 to 64, and 11.3% who were 65 years of age or older.  The median age was 36 years. For every 100 females, there were 99.3 males.  For every 100 females age 18 and over, there were 96.7 males.

The median income for a household in the township was $39,036, and the median income for a family was $43,884. Males had a median income of $36,970 versus $25,036 for females. The per capita income for the township was $18,212.  About 11.1% of families and 10.6% of the population were below the poverty line, including 10.0% of those under age 18 and 7.7% of those age 65 or over.

References

Townships in Mecosta County, Michigan
Charter townships in Michigan
1858 establishments in Michigan
Populated places established in 1858